Lake Waramaug State Park is a  public recreation area located on the northwest shore of Lake Waramaug in the town of Kent, Litchfield County, Connecticut. The state park's first  were purchased by the state in 1920. The park offers swimming, fishing, picnicking, camping, and a launch for car-top boating and canoeing.

References

External links
Lake Waramaug State Park Connecticut Department of Energy and Environmental Protection

State parks of Connecticut
Parks in Litchfield County, Connecticut
Landforms of Litchfield County, Connecticut
Protected areas established in 1920
1920 establishments in Connecticut
Campgrounds in Connecticut
Kent, Connecticut